Elżbieta Gacek (born 1938) was a Soviet-Polish Politician (Communist).

She was a member of the Polish Council of State, making her a member of the Collective Head of State, from 1985 to 1988.

References

Possibly living people
1938 births
20th-century Polish women politicians
20th-century Polish politicians
Polish communists